The Parry Peninsula on the north coast of Canada's Northwest Territories is bounded on the west by Franklin Bay, on the north by Amundsen Gulf, and on the east by Darnley Bay.The nearest settlement is Paulatuk. It is also home to the Cape Parry Migratory Bird Sanctuary on the northern extremity of the Parry Peninsula.

History
It is named for the Arctic explorer William Edward Parry. On the northern tip of the peninsula is Cape Parry. A headland, and a Distant Early Warning Line site on Parry Peninsula northern tip.

See also
Cape Parry
Paulatuk
Distant Early Warning Line

References

Further reading

Peninsulas of the Northwest Territories